José Benjamín Quintero (15 October 1924 – 26 February 1999) was a Panamanian theatre director, producer and pedagogue best known for his interpretations of the works of Eugene O'Neill.

Biography

Early years
Quintero was born in Panama City, Panama, the fourth of 4 children, to Carlos Quintero Rivera, from Panama, and Consuelo Palmerola from Panama.  As a boy he was an acolyte, though he described his childhood in other ways as a disaster—the result of a domineering and overbearing father. He was educated in the United States at Los Angeles City College, the University of Southern California, and the Goodman School of Drama at the Art Institute of Chicago (now at DePaul University). where he decided on a career in theatre. After notification of his intention, his father, who wanted him to be a physician, declared him dead, leading to Jose's seven-year estrangement from his family.

Career
Quintero co-founded the Circle in the Square Theatre in Greenwich Village with Theodore Mann in 1951; this is regarded as the birth of Off-Broadway theatre. He became one of the most celebrated Broadway and Off Broadway directors and producers and worked with some of the greatest names in American theatre. His own name is inextricably linked to that of the American playwright Eugene O'Neill. Quintero's interest contributed to the rediscovery of O'Neill. Quintero staged several of his works, including The Iceman Cometh in 1956, which launched the career of Jason Robards. Later that year, Quintero's production of the New York premiere of Long Day's Journey into Night established his reputation as the quintessential director of O'Neill's dramas and won Tony Awards for Best Play and Best Actor (Fredric March). In 1963, he directed Strange Interlude, with a cast which included Geraldine Page, Jane Fonda, Franchot Tone, Ben Gazzara, Pat Hingle and Betty Field. In 1967, he directed Ingrid Bergman in More Stately Mansions in Los Angeles and New York. In 1968, Quintero traveled to México to direct the Mexican star Dolores del Río in The Lady of the Camellias but was dismissed by the actress because of his problem with alcohol.  His production of A Moon for the Misbegotten, at the Academy Playhouse, Lake Forest, Illinois in 1973, won the Tony award for Best Direction in 1974. In 1988, he directed the revival of Long Day's Journey Into Night with Jason Robards Jr and Colleen Dewhurst. In the course of his career Quintero directed O'Neill plays nineteen times.

Quintero did not limit himself to the works of O'Neill. He directed over seventy productions by a great number of writers, including Truman Capote, Jean Cocteau, Thornton Wilder, Jean Genet and Brendan Behan. He also directed plays by Tennessee Williams, including the 1952 production of Summer and Smoke which made Geraldine Page a star and the short-lived 1968 production of The Seven Descents of Myrtle. In 1961, he directed Vivien Leigh and Warren Beatty in the film version of Williams's The Roman Spring of Mrs. Stone which brought Lotte Lenya an Academy Award nomination as Best Supporting Actress. In 1973, he also directed three one act plays at the Academy Playhouse in Lake Forest, Illinois.  Hello From Bertha, Lady of Larkspur Lotion and The Orchestra.  He chose a cast he said belonged in Broadway. The brilliant cast included Jeanie Columbo, Ralph Williams, Betty Miller, Nancy Wickwire, Charlotte Jones and Janet Dowd. In 1990, he directed Liv Ullmann in Noël Coward's Private Lives at the National Theatre in Oslo. He also directed operas for the Metropolitan Opera and the Dallas Opera.

Quintero was a noted teacher and lectured on theatre and gave master classes in acting at the University of Houston and Florida State University. In 1996 he directed two early O'Neill plays, The Long Voyage Home and Ile, at the Provincetown Repertory Theater in Massachusetts.

Personal life
Quintero battled alcoholism and with the help of his life partner, Nicholas Tsacrios,  was able to defeat his addiction in the 1970s. He was diagnosed with throat cancer in 1987 that necessitated the removal of his larynx which ultimately led to his 1999 death at Memorial Sloan-Kettering Cancer Center in Manhattan. He remained active until nearly the end of his life.

Legacy
The José Quintero Theatre on West 42nd Street in Manhattan was named in his honor. Quintero is also a member of the American Theater Hall of Fame. He was inducted in 1979.

The Jose Quintero Lab Theatre, a 200 black box theatre used by University of Houston School of Theatre and Dance, is named in his honor.

Memberships
Directors Guild of America
Stage Directors and Choreographers Society

Bibliography 
 
Gabrielle (Buffalo, New York, 1974).  Play.
 (play)

Productions
1949: The Glass Menagerie (T. Williams), Woodstock Summer Theatre, New York.
1951: Dark of the Moon (Richardson and Berney), Circle in the Square Theatre, New York.
1951: Burning Bright (Steinbeck), Circle in the Square Theatre, New York.
1951: Bonds of Interest (Benavente y Martinez), Circle in the Square Theatre, New York.
1952: Yerma (Lorca), Circle in the Square Theatre, New York.
1952: Summer and Smoke (T. Williams), Circle in the Square Theatre, New York.
1953: The Grass Harp (Capote), Circle in the Square Theatre, New York.
1953: American Gothic (Wolfson), Circle in the Square Theatre, New York.
1953: In the Summer House (Bowles), Broadway, New York.
1954: The Girl on the Via Flaminia (Hayes), Circle in the Square Theatre, New York.
1954: Portrait of a Lady (Archibald, adapted from James), ANTA Theatre, New York.
1954: The Hostage (Behan), Circle in the Square Theatre, New York.
1955: The Long Christmas Dinner (Wilder), University of Boston, Massachusetts.
1955: The King and the Duke, Circle in the Square Theatre, New York.
1955: La Ronde (Schitzler), Circle in the Square Theatre, New York.
1955: The Cradle Song (Underhill), Circle in the Square Theatre, New York.
1955: The Iceman Cometh (O'Neill), Circle in the Square Theatre, New York.
1956: The Innkeepers (Apstein), New York.
1956: Long Day's Journey Into Night (O'Neill), Helen Hayes Theatre, New York.
1957: Lost in the Stars (M. Anderson), City Opera, New York.
1957: The Square Root of Wonderful (McCullers), Princeton University, New Jersey.
1958: Children of Darkness (Mayer), Circle in the Square Theatre, New York.
1958: A Moon for the Misbegotten (O'Neill), Festival of Two Worlds, Spoleto, Italy.
1958: Cavalleria Rusticana (Mascagni), Metropolitan Opera, New York.
1958: I Pagliacci (Leoncavallo), Metropolitan Opera, New York.
1958: The Quare Fellow (Behan), Circle in the Square Theatre, New York.
1959: Our Town (Wilder), Circle in the Square Theatre, New York.
1959: Macbeth (Shakespeare), Boston, Massachusetts.
1960: The Balcony (Genet), Circle in the Square Theatre, New York.
1960: Camino Real (T. Williams), Circle in the Square Theatre, New York.
1960: The Triumph of Saint Joan (Joio), City Opera, New York.
1960: Laurette (Young, adapted from Courtney), New Haven, Connecticut.
1961: Look, We've Come Through (Wheeler), New York.
1962: Plays for Bleecker Street (Wilder), Circle in the Square Theatre, New York.
1962: Great Day in the Morning (Cannon), New York.
1962: Pullman Car Hiawatha (Wilder), Circle in the Square Theatre, New York.
1963: Desire Under the Elms (O'Neill), Circle in the Square Theatre, New York.
1963: Strange Interlude (O'Neill), Broadway, New York.
1964: Marco Millions (O'Neill), Lincoln Center, New York.
1964: Hughie (O'Neill), Royale Theatre, New York.
1964: Susanna, Metropolitan Opera, New York.
1964: La Bohème (Puccini), Metropolitan Opera, New York.
1965: Diamond Orchid (Lawrence and Lee), New York.
1965: Matty and the Moron and the Madonna (Leiberman), New York.
1965: A Moon for the Misbegotten (O'Neill), Arena Stage, Buffalo, New York.
1966: Pousse Cafe, New York.
1967: More Stately Mansions (O'Neill), Ahmanson Theatre, Los Angeles, and New York.
1968: The Seven Descents of Myrtle (T. Williams), New York.
1968: The Lady of the Camellias (Dumas), México City
1969: Episode in the Life of an Author (Anouilh) and The Orchestra (Anouilh), Buffalo, New York.
1970: Gandhi, Playhouse Theatre, New York.
1971: Johnny Johnson (Green), New York.
1971: The Big Coca-Cola Swamp in the Sky, Westport, Connecticut.
1973: A Moon for the Misbegotten (O'Neill) The Orchestra (Jean Annouilh) Hello From Bertha/Lady of Larkspur Lotion (T. Williams)  Academy Playhouse/Academy Festival Theatre Lake Forest Ill.
1973: A Moon for the Misbegotten (O'Neill), Morosco Theatre, New York.
1974: Gabrielle (Quintero), Studio Arena, Buffalo, New York, and Washington D.C.
1975: The Skin of Our Teeth (Wilder), Washington D.C.
1975: A Moon for the Misbegotten (O'Neill), Oslo, Norway.
1976: Knock, Knock (Feiffer), New York.
1976: Hughie (O'Neill), Chicago, Illinois.
1977: Anna Christie (O'Neill), New York, Toronto, and Washington D.C.
1977: A Touch of the Poet (O'Neill), New York.
1978: Same Time, Next Year, Oslo, Norway.
1978: The Bear (Chekhov) and The Human Voice (Cocteau), Melbourne and Sydney, Australia.
1979: The Human Voice (Cocteau), Circle in the Square Theatre, New York.
1979: Faith Healer (Friel), Boston, Massachusetts, and Longacre Theatre, New York.
1980: Clothes for a Summer Hotel (T. Williams), Washington D.C. and Cort Theatre, New York.
1980: Welded (O'Neill), University of Columbia, New York.
1980: Ah! Wilderness (O'Neill), National Theatre, Mexico City.
1981: The Time of Your Life (Saroyan), Brandeis University, Boston, Massachusetts.
1981: Ah! Wilderness (O'Neill), West Palm Beach, Los Angeles.
1983: Cat on a Hot Tin Roof (T. Williams), Mark Taper Forum, Los Angeles.
1984: Rainsnakes, Long Wharf Theatre, New Haven, Connecticut.
1985: The Iceman Cometh (O'Neill), Washington D.C., New York, and Los Angeles.
1988: Long Day's Journey into Night (O'Neill), Yale University and New York.
1990: Private Lives (Coward), Oslo, Norway.
Films
The Roman Spring of Mrs Stone, 1961.
Television
Our Town, 1959
The Nurses, 1963
Medea, 1963
J. F. Kennedy's Profiles in Courage, 1965
A Moon for the Misbegotten, 1973
The Human Voice, 1979
Hughie, 1981.
Radio
In the Zone, 1988
The Long Voyage Home, 1988
The Moon of the Caribbees, 1989
Bound East for Cardiff, 1989
The Hairy Ape, 1989
The Emperor Jones, 1990.

References

External links 
 
 

1924 births
1999 deaths
People from Panama City
Panamanian people of Spanish descent
American theatre directors
Deaths from esophageal cancer
Drama Desk Award winners
LGBT theatre directors
Panamanian LGBT people
Tony Award winners
Deaths from cancer in New York (state)
Los Angeles City College alumni
University of Southern California alumni
20th-century LGBT people